The T249 Vigilante was a prototype 37 mm self-propelled anti-aircraft gun (SPAAG) designed as a replacement for the Bofors 40 mm gun and M42 Duster in US Army service.  The system consisted of a 37 mm T250 six-barrel Gatling gun mounted on a lengthened M113 armored personnel carrier platform.

By the early 1960s, the US Army declared that gun-based systems were outdated, and canceled further development in favor of the MIM-46 Mauler missile system that also failed to enter service. The designer, the Sperry Utah Engineering Laboratory, later revived the Vigilante, rechambering it for NATO-standard 35×228mm rounds and mounting it on a M48 Patton tank chassis for the Division Air Defense (DIVAD) contest.  However, it ultimately lost to Ford's M247 Sergeant York that also failed to enter service.

Development
Very little information exists of the T249 Vigilante and its T250 cannon. The conceptual design for the T250 cannon was initiated in 1956.  While the design of cannon of this caliber would ordinarily be handled by Watervliet Arsenal, it was decided that Springfield Armory would take responsibility due to their previous development experience with smaller caliber rotary cannon such the 20mm T171.  The T250 was the largest Gatling gun ever assembled.  Its 37×219mmSR round was based upon a shortened and necked-down 40×311mmR Bofors cartridge case.  Hydraulically powered, the gun was able to vary between 120 rpm for (especially stationary) ground targets and 3,000 rpm for air targets.

It had a 192-round drum magazine, which in the maximum 3,000 rpm mode would have equated to approximately 4 seconds of fire.  When Springfield engineers finished their work in 1962, the design was handed over to Watervliet for production.  The Sperry Utah Engineering Laboratory was selected to handle the integration of the T250 gun with the modified M113 chassis to create the T249.

Surviving Examples
One T249 Vigilante is currently displayed at the Air Defense Artillery Training Support Facility, at Ft. Sill, OK. This example was previously located at the US Army Ordnance Museum in Aberdeen, MD.
A T 250 rotary cannon is on display in Wehrtechnische Studiensammlung in Koblenz, Germany.

See also
GAU-8 Avenger
GAU-13
GAU-12 Equalizer
M61 Vulcan
M163 VADS
Gryazev-Shipunov GSh-6-23

References

External links
Information on the Vigilante and Red Queen projects
Springfield Armory Museum Collection Record for T250

Anti-aircraft guns of the Cold War
Rotary cannon
Cold War weapons of the United States
Self-propelled anti-aircraft weapons of the United States
37 mm artillery